The City of Fading Light is a 1985 novel written by Australian author Jon Cleary about a Hollywood actress who tries to rescue her Jewish mother from 1939 Berlin. The book features Sean Carmody, the character from his earlier novel The Sundowners.

Cleary researched the novel on a trip to Berlin with his family and based the plot on a real British plan to assassinate Hitler prior to the war.

References

External links
The City of Fading Light at AustLit (subscription required)

1985 Australian novels
William Collins, Sons books
William Morrow and Company books
Novels set during World War II
Novels set in Berlin
Fiction set in 1939
Novels by Jon Cleary